The 1990 Davis Cup (also known as the 1990 Davis Cup by NEC for sponsorship purposes) was the 79th edition of the Davis Cup, the most important tournament between national teams in men's tennis. 85 teams would enter the competition, 16 in the World Group, 19 in the Americas Zone, 19 in the Asia/Oceania Zone, and 31 in the Europe/Africa Zone. Barbados, Costa Rica, Guatemala, Togo, Trinidad and Tobago and Zambia made their first appearances in the tournament.

The United States defeated Australia in the final, held at the Florida Suncoast Dome in St. Petersburg, Florida, United States, on 30 November–2 December, to win their 29th title overall.

World Group

Draw

Final
United States vs. Australia

World Group Qualifying Round

Date: 21–23 September

The eight losing teams in the World Group first round ties and eight winners of the Zonal Group I final round ties competed in the World Group Qualifying Round for spots in the 1991 World Group.

Americas Zone

Group I

  and  advance to World Group Qualifying Round.

  relegated to Group II in 1991.

Group II

  promoted to Group I in 1991.

Asia/Oceania Zone

Group I

  relegated to Group II in 1991.

  and  advance to World Group Qualifying Round.

Group II

  promoted to Group I in 1991.

Europe/Africa Zone

Group I

  and  relegated to Group II in 1991.

Group II Europe

  promoted to Group I in 1991.

Group II Africa

  promoted to Group I in 1991.

References
General

Specific

External links
Davis Cup Official Website

 
Davis Cups by year
Davis Cup
Davis Cup